State Road 350 (SR 350) is a state road in the south–eastern section of the state of Indiana. SR 350 was originally introduced in the 1931 routed between Milan and Aurora. The road was extended west to the Osgood in 1932. In 1950s the SR 350 had a couple of minor realignments and a segment was paved. The rest of the route was paved in the early 1960s.

Route description
SR 350 starts in Osgood at the corner of Buckeye Street and Beech Street. Buckeye Street runs northwest–southeast carrying U.S. Route 421, and Beech Street runs northeasterly from here carrying SR 350. The highway passes through residential neighborhoods, before leaving Osgood. After leaving Osgood the road turns more east–west passing through rural Ripley County. The highway enters the community of Delaware and has an intersection with SR 129. After SR 129 the road becomes southeast–northwest and heads towards Pierceville. In Pierceville the road parallels a CSX Transportation rail track, passing a few residential properties.

East of Pierceville SR 350 turns towards the east leaves the rail track and passes through rural Ripley County for a short distance before entering the town of Milan. The highway passes through the northern part of Milan and an intersection with SR 101. After Milan the road turns towards the southeast and passes north of Moores Hill, before passing through rural Dearborn County. While in rural Dearborn County the road passes near Sparta, Mount Sinai, and just north of Wilmington. East of Wilmington SR 350 passes South Dearborn High School, before entering Aurora. In Aurora the roadway crosses over the south fork of the Hogan Creek. The SR 350 designation ends at an intersection with US 50 crossing northeast–southwest and SR 56 continuing towards the southeast.

History
SR 350 had its beginning in 1931 when it was designated, by Indiana State Highway Commission, from Milan to Aurora. By September 1932 SR 350 was extended west to an intersection with SR 29 (now US 421), in Osgood. The road was moved to its modern routing between Sparta and north of Milan between 1956 and 1957. Between 1957 and 1959 the road was rerouted around Mount Sinai onto the modern routing. At the same time the road was paved between the eastern in of the reroute and Wilmington was paved. The rest of SR 350 was paved between 1960 and 1961. Since the road was paved, SR 350 has not undergone any major changes.

Major intersections

References

External links

350
Transportation in Dearborn County, Indiana
Transportation in Ripley County, Indiana